Enamul Haq Manju is a Bangladesh Jamaat-e-Islami politician and the former member of parliament for Cox's Bazar-1.

Career
Manju was elected to parliament from Cox's Bazar-1 as a Bangladesh Jamaat-e-Islami candidate in 1991.

References

Bangladesh Jamaat-e-Islami politicians
Living people
5th Jatiya Sangsad members
People from Cox's Bazar District
Year of birth missing (living people)